Butler, Shine, Stern & Partners (also known as BSSP) is an agency headquartered in Sausalito, California, providing services in advertising, online content, experiential marketing, web development, data analytics, integrated communications planning, and strategic brand consulting. BSSP is one of the largest independent agencies on the West Coast.

History
Butler, Shine, Stern & Partners was founded in 1993 when John Butler and Mike Shine became the first creative team to leave Goodby, Silverstein & Partners to form their own agency.  Greg Stern joined shortly thereafter as Chief Executive Officer.

In 2003, BSSP acquired SF Interactive (SFI). In 2005, they launched Cleaver Content, an in-house studio that the agency leverages to shoot, edit, code, design and produce all forms of content.

As advertising agency for Converse, BSSP created the award-winning "Brand Democracy" campaign - one of the first uses of consumer-generated content as advertising.  

In 2006, BSSP took over BMW's MINI Cooper account after Crispin, Porter + Bogusky dropped them for Volkswagen.  In 2009, BSSP won a Gold Effie Award for their MINI Clubman advertising campaign. 

BSSP worked with Priceline for over 9 years, and created the iconic Priceline Negotiator campaign featuring William Shatner.  

Awarded Small Agency of the Decade by Adweek Media: Best of 2000s, BSSP was named one of the top Places to Work in the U.S. by Outside Magazine in 2011, 2012, 2013 and 2014.  

In 2017, BSSP resigned the MINI account after an 11 year long relationship.  Leveraging their automotive experience, the agency was soon after awarded the Mitsubishi advertising account.  

In 2018, BSSP was named AdAge's Small Agency of the Year based on their accomplishments with clients including Mitsubishi, Blue Shield of California, and leading basketball videogame title NBA 2K.

BSSP has fostered a multi-year partnership with Blue Shield of California, creating notable campaigns for this brand.  

The agency has  supported a steadily increasing roster of consumer brands owned by Sovos Brands, including Rao's Homemade, Michael Angelo's, Noosa yoghurt, and Birchbenders.

In addition to leading BSSP for over 27 years, the agency's founders are industry leaders:  John Butler was previously president of the prestigious One Club, and Greg Stern served as Chairman of the 4As.  

The agency's founding partners Greg Stern and John Butler have initiated a leadership succession plan and the agency is now led by CEO Tracey Pattani.

Clients
ESPN, Blue Shield of California, City of Hope, Sorel, FootJoy, Sovos Brands (Rao's Homemade, Michael Angelo's, Noosa), Traditional Medicinals Tea

References

Advertising agencies of the United States
Companies based in Marin County, California